Natalia Vico (born 10 November 1992) is an Argentinian team handball player. She plays for the Godoy Cruz MDZ (Tomba) and on the Argentine national team. She represented Argentina at the 2013 World Women's Handball Championship in Serbia.

References

Argentine female handball players
1992 births
Living people
21st-century Argentine women